Sky Sword may refer to:
Sky Sword I, a short range Taiwanese anti-air missile 
Sky Sword II, a medium range Taiwanese anti-air missile